The Culinistas is a culinary resource that shares the keys to good food and good company, giving people the skills and confidence to explore, be creative, and connect to each other. The company's mission is to provide people with a framework to be creative, have fun, build confidence, and support meaningful connections around the table.

In-home Chef Services 
The Culinistas' in-home private chef service matches vetted chefs with households in the NYC metro area including The Hamptons, Washington, D.C., and Los Angeles. Services include weekly meal preps and everyday celebrations, plus full-time or part-time chef engagements, postnatal meal prep, and cooking classes.

Digital Content 
On its site, social, and newsletter channels, The Culinistas shares the culinary frameworks, hosting tips, and product recommendations that make cooking and hosting fun and meaningful.

Background 
The company was founded in 2006 by Jill Donenfeld and was previously called "The Dish's Dish."

Press 
 The company has been featured in The New York Times, the Los Angeles Times, Food and Wine Magazine, New York Magazine, Entrepreneur, Fast Company, Vanity Fair, and Lucky.

Founder Jill Donenfeld 
Jill is a hospitality expert with a global perspective and has over a decade of experience as a private chef, caterer, cookbook author and restaurant veteran. In addition to running the v1 of The Culinistas, Jill has written four cookbooks, including “Better on Toast” (Harper Collins, 2015) and “Party Like a Culinista” (Lake Isle Press, 2011), as well as international cookbook titles in Madagascar and India. Her writing has been featured in Food & Wine, Men’s Journal, The Huffington Post, TimeOut and National Geographic.

References 

Catering and food service companies of the United States
Food and drink companies established in 2006
Companies based in New York City
Companies based in Los Angeles
Companies based in Chicago
2006 establishments in New York City